The 2018 ADAC GT Masters was the twelfth season of the ADAC GT Masters, the grand tourer-style sports car racing founded by the German automobile club ADAC. The season began on 14 April at Oschersleben and ended on 23 September at Hockenheim after seven double-header meetings.

Entry list

Race calendar and results
On 29 November 2017, the ADAC announced the 2018 calendar.

Championship standings
Scoring system
Championship points were awarded for the first ten positions in each race. Entries were required to complete 75% of the winning car's race distance in order to be classified and earn points. Individual drivers were required to participate for a minimum of 25 minutes in order to earn championship points in any race.

Drivers' championships

Overall

Junior Cup

Trophy Cup

Teams' championship

Notes

References

External links

ADAC GT Masters seasons
ADAC GT Masters